Aleksandr Gradovsky (1841–1889) was a Russian jurist. A professor of law at St. Petersburg University since 1869, he was a leading theorist of Russian administrative and constitutional law. He was succeeded by Nikolay Korkunov.

References
 

1841 births
1889 deaths
National University of Kharkiv alumni
Academic staff of Saint Petersburg State University
Russian jurists